Aidan O'Mahony (born 8 June 1980, in Tralee) is a retired Irish Gaelic footballer who played at senior level for the Kerry county team. He has 5 All-Irelands, 3 NFLs, 10  Munster Championships, 1 County Senior Championship, 1 Senior Club County Championship, 1 County U21 Championship, 1 County Intermediate Championship and 2 All Stars.

A Garda Síochána member, he played for Kerry's U21 team in 2000 and 2001. He debuted for the Kerry senior team in the 2003 League campaign and in the Championship versus Clare in 2004. He started the 2004 All-Ireland Final against Mayo, which Kerry won. He repeated the performance in the 2006 All-Ireland Final against the same team. Kerry dominated, and Mayo were easily defeated by a score of 4-15 to 3-05, and O'Mahony picked up the RTÉ Man of the Match Award for scoring 2 points and marking Ciarán McDonald. He won further All-Ireland medals in 2006 and 2007, gaining an All Star in each of those years. He has 2 NFL medals from 2004 and 2005 and also won the Munster club championship with his club Rathmore. O'Mahony again played an important part as Kerry reached the 2008 All-Ireland In 2010, O'Mahony took a break from inter-county football after Kerry's NFL campaign for personal reasons; he, however, returned to the panel for the Championship.

In 2005, following the All-Ireland final loss to Tyrone, O'Mahoney tested positive for a banned steroid, salbutamol. However he faced no censure because salbutamol is found in asthma inhalers, and he was thus granted a therapeutic use exemption.

He once played on for more than 40 minutes in a club final with a broken leg, scoring two points.

O'Mahony announced his retirement from inter-county football on 23 January 2017.
O’Mahoney made 70 championship appearances and featured in 85 league games for Kerry.

In January 2017, O'Mahony was a contestant on Dancing with the Stars. He went on to win the competition, with his dancing partner Valeria Milova.
In January 2023 after winning the Junior Club All Ireland with Rathmore, O'Mahony announced his retirement from Gaelic football.

References

External links
Profile of Aidan O'Mahony

1980 births
Living people
All Stars Awards winners (football)
Dancing with the Stars winners
Gaelic football backs
Garda Síochána officers
Irish international rules football players
Kerry inter-county Gaelic footballers
People from Tralee
Rathmore Gaelic footballers
Winners of five All-Ireland medals (Gaelic football)